Power Rangers Time Force is a 2001 Power Rangers season that featured the fight between the Time Force Power Rangers and Ransik's army of mutants.

Time Force Power Rangers

The Time Force Rangers are fictional characters and heroes in the Power Rangers universe, appearing in the television series Power Rangers Time Force. They are members of the Time Force organization, law-enforcement officers sent from the future to prevent changes in the past.

Wesley "Wes" Collins
Wesley Collins is the main protagonist of the series. He is the Red Time Force Ranger who shares leadership duty with Jen. He pilots Time Flyer 1 and his primary weapons are his Chrono Sabers and the V1 Vector Weapon. Even though technically, Jen is the leader of the team, as Red Ranger, Wes is considered an informal co-leader, ever since regaining the Red Chrono Morpher from Alex. A similar situation was used in  Mighty Morphin Alien Rangers in which the female character Delphine, the White Ranger, is the leader, but stories revolved around the Blue Ranger, Cestro. Wes is a rich kid from Silver Hills that was chosen to become the Red Time Force Ranger by Jen in order to unlock the rest of the Chrono Morphers due to his DNA matching the original Red Time Force Ranger, Alex. After unlocking the Chrono Morphers, Jen takes back the Chrono Morpher until he proves himself. Wes eventually develops feelings for Jen, but put those feelings on hold when her thought-to-be-dead fiancée, Alex comes to present day to take over the team.

According to Alex, Wes' father is supposed to die of his injuries inflicted by Ransik and Wes is to take over Bio-Lab which he does do for a time. Wes proves capable of being in charge of the company, but returns to the Rangers, saving them from Frax and reacquiring his morpher from Alex who, despite telling Wes of his father's fate himself, saves Mr. Collins with future technology. Wes finally reconciles with his father who supports him being the Red Ranger. Wes also falls in love with Jen but is hesitant to reveal his affection for fear that Jen does not reciprocate it. The return of Alex only further agitates Wes into believing this. In the finale, Wes forces the other Rangers to return to the future as Alex reveals that they will die as they fight against Ransik, Frax, Doomtron, and the Cyclobot army, even with Eric's help. After Alex reveals that Wes saves the city but dies doing it, the other Rangers return to help him and together they defeat the Cyclobot army. Wes destroys Doomtron and Frax with the Q-Rex (which he has control of as Eric gave him the Quantum Morpher) and is the only one that lands a real hit on Ransik using his Red Battle Fire Armor. Ultimately Ransik surrenders and the other Rangers have to return to the future. Wes sadly says goodbye to the other Rangers and he and Jen profess their love, but she has no choice but to return to the future. Wes retains his Red Ranger powers and is offered command of the Silver Guardians (now protecting the city for free) which he accepts on the condition that the recovered Eric is his partner.

In Power Rangers Wild Force, Wes and Eric, now best friends, team up with the Wild Force Rangers to defeat the Mut-Orgs. Wes is reunited with the rest of the team, and the repentant Nadira and Ransik, but is upset with Jen who has been in the past for a while and never contacted him. The two reunite and still clearly in love with each other, though it is left unrevealed if she remains in the past with him or returns to the future. Wes helps destroy the Mut-Orgs after Ransik destroys their mutant sides and celebrates the victory with the Time Force and Wild Force Rangers as well as Nadira and the now fully human Ransik. During Forever Red, Wes and Eric team-up against the remnants of the Machine Empire with 8 other Red Rangers and helps defeat them. He would return again later to join the veteran Ranger army in Power Rangers Super Megaforce, and again for the 25th anniversary special in Power Rangers Super Ninja Steel.

Wes is played by Jason Faunt.

Lucas Kendall
Lucas Kendall is the Blue Time Force Ranger. He pilots Time Flyer 2 and his primary weapons are his Chrono Sabers and the V2 Vector Weapon. He is vainly obsessed with two things: his looks and cars. In the year 3000, he is a race car driver, and acts as a big brother to Trip. Lucas is also "cool", the sort of guy whom everyone seems jealous of, and seems to be a big hit with the ladies.

After the Time Force Rangers return to the future, they later come back to assist the Wild Force Rangers in battling the Mut-Orgs. Lucas goes back to the future, revealing a possible romance between him and Nadira who had liked him at least as far back as "Nadira's Dream Date". He also apparently set her up so she did not have to go to prison by presumably getting her community service or something similar. When neither Jen nor Wes are around to lead the team he usually leads the rest. He would later return again as part of the Ranger army in Super Megaforce.

Lucas is played by Michael Copon.

Trip
Trip is the Green Time Force Ranger and a native of the planet Xybria (which makes him the third non-human main core Ranger). He pilots Time Flyer 3 and his primary weapons are his Chrono Sabers and the V3 Vector Weapon. Thanks to a green gem embedded in his forehead, he has the ability to read minds, pinpoint locations, and see the future in some instances. Green-haired, Trip is the naive member of the team, since his society is one without secrets. As such, he is sometimes gullible, leading to negative consequences. When blending in while in Wes' time period, Trip wears a hat to hide his forehead gem; his hair can be passed off as dye. Trip looks up to the other Rangers, but is a good Ranger in his own right. He is also a technological genius, having created the Electro Booster weapon and other arsenal. He can be considered the brains of the team. Trip is also willing to stand up for what he believes is right, such as when he tried to protect a mutant named Notacon (who did not want to be evil) from being destroyed by Eric Myers just because Notacon was a mutant. Trip even put himself on the line to protect the poor mutant, and Eric deliberately missed the pair, sparing them. Trip was in part responsible for Nadira's reform. He forced her to help a woman in labor and the sight of the newborn made Nadira rethink her ways. Trip was sent back to the future by Wes, but accompanied the others back to the present to help him fight.

He later returned with the other Time Force Rangers to battle the Mut-Orgs alongside the Wild Force Power Rangers in "Reinforcements from the Future". He also joined the team in helping the Megaforce Rangers in their final battle with the Armada.

In early casting sides, Trip's surname was given as "Regis", although this was not used in-show or in any other non-prerelease media.

Trip is played by Kevin Kleinberg.

Katie Walker
Katie Walker is the Yellow Time Force Ranger. She pilots Time Flyer 4 and her primary weapons are her Chrono Sabers and the V4 Vector Weapon. Gifted with unnatural strength that might be the product of genetic engineering, Katie is always open with her feelings, a sharp contrast to the conservative Jen. Katie likes to hug her fellow Ranger really tightly, which is a habit of hers. She is shown to be very affectionate and loving to her teammates, especially to Trip, who she is seen usually hugging, being overly protective of, and consoling him. She loves her family a lot so she was devastated to hear that the future was being altered, and feared what could happen to them.

After returning to the future, she comes back one more time to help fight the Mut-Orgs. Katie partnered with her fellow Yellow Rangers, Kelsey Winslow from Lightspeed Rescue and Taylor Earhardt in Wild Force. She would also appear as part of the Ranger army in Super Megaforce.

Katie is played by Deborah Estelle Philips.

Jennifer "Jen" Scotts
Jen Scotts is the female protagonist of the series. She is the Pink Time Force Ranger and the leader (alongside Wes) of the team. She pilots Time Flyer 5 and her primary weapons are her Chrono Sabers and the V5 Vector Weapon. After the capture of the villain Ransik, Jen's boyfriend, Alex, proposes to her only to be killed the next day. She vows to avenge Alex and capture Ransik, who escapes. Just like Wes, Jen is a very skilled hand-to-hand fighter, even without her Ranger powers. She takes the Pink, Blue, Green and Yellow Chrono Morphers and goes back in time to 2001. Jen is a cold, strict, no-nonsense leader to the Rangers, and while getting to know them better, her attitude changes and she is shown to have a calm and carefree side. She eventually ends her engagement with Alex when it is revealed that he is still alive, as she has fallen in love with Wes.

When Jen and the other Time Force Rangers reunite to help Wild Force Rangers battle the Mut-Orgs, she is paired up with White Tiger Ranger Alyssa Enrilè. She traveled back in time before her other teammates from the year 3001 to track the Mut-Orgs, and later saved Wes, Eric, and the Wild Force Rangers from the trio of villains. She would then find herself in the unlikely position of accepting Ransik and Nadira's help against the creatures, but decided to give her old foes a second chance. In Power Rangers: Super Megaforce, she and her teammates later return as part of the veteran Ranger army to battle the Armada.

Jen is played by Erin Cahill.

Eric Myers
Eric Myers is the Quantum Ranger, the sixth Ranger of the Time Force Power Rangers. He pilots the Quantasaurus Rex and his primary weapon is the Quantum Defender. Eric is first seen as a soldier working for the Silver Guardians, an organization established by Mr. Collins to protect Bio-Lab. Wes later reveals that they attended the same private school. Whereas Wes came from a rich family, Eric worked hard and was dirt poor, and eventually decided to leave the school, saying that he had "bigger plans". Eric was resentful for having to work so hard while Wes did not have to work at all. From this, Eric grew bitter and had few friends, although Wes tried to befriend him on several occasions. After discovering that Wes is the Red Time Force Ranger, Eric attempts to find his own powers. He becomes aware that the Time Force Rangers are looking for the Quantum Ranger power and he gets to it first, registering his voice on the Quantum Morpher so only he can use it. When Wes attempts to retrieve the Quantum Morpher from him out of general distrust by the Time Force team, he and Eric fight; the latter wins. As a result, the Rangers have no choice but to accept his control of the Morpher. Wes later accompanies him in a journey back in time to find the Quantum Ranger's Megazord, the Q-Rex. Time Force HQ, aids Eric, by giving him new powers. After the previous leader of the Silver Guardians was injured in action, Eric was able to eventually gain control of the Q-Rex enough for Mr. Collins to promote him to being the leader of the Silver Guardians, much to the Rangers (mostly Wes') dismay. Eric becomes a reluctant ally to the regular Rangers, remaining separate and occasionally aiding them at certain times. His peers often find his methods intimidating, but deep down they know he is almost always taking the best approach. Unlike Wes, Eric works alone and never lets anyone push him around. Eric acts more like lone wolf leader. As time goes by, Eric makes a new friend in the form of a young girl named Alice, who serves as his loyal companion in his lonely hours and the Rangers learn to trust Eric. He is later known for commanding fanatic loyalty from his comrades and is known for pulling his team together when beginning a new mission. During the end of the series, Eric is severely injured by a laser shot from a Cyclobot after taking a shot meant for Wes and Mr. Collins and he hands his Morpher over to Wes. He recovers though, and becomes co-leader of the Silver Guardians with Wes who was offered command, but accepted only under the condition that Eric was his partner. The two from then on led the Silver Guardians (now working for free) in protecting the city from threats.

Eric later makes a few other appearances. Now best friends with Wes, he teams up with the other Time Force Rangers in the team-up battle with the Wild Force Power Rangers, who are trying to stop a trio of Mutant-Org hybrids. During this time, he develops a love relationship with Taylor Earhardt (the Yellow Wild Force Ranger) due to having ticketed her for speeding.

He is also one of ten Red Rangers to battle in the episode Forever Red, which celebrated the 10th anniversary of the Power Rangers franchise.

His Zord (the Q-Rex) was later reclaimed by Time Force, and reconstructed for the use of the Super Megaforce Silver Ranger in Power Rangers Super Megaforce. Eric himself would later join the Ranger army in the final battle with the Armada.

Eric is played by Daniel Southworth.

Zords

Time Fliers
The Time Fliers are five jets created in the future by Time Force. They are summoned by Circuit, who contacts Captain Logan to dispatch them. To reach the Rangers, they fly through a time portal.
 Time Flyer 1: Piloted by Wesley Collins, armed with the Plasma Vulcan. Forms the frontal segment of Jet Mode. Time Jet 1's underside is Time Force Megazord Mode Red's chest, while the topside is the chest of Time Force Megazord Mode Blue.
 Time Flyer 2: Piloted by Lucas Kendall, armed with the Pulse Machine Gun. Forms Time Force Megazord Mode Red's left leg, Time Force Megazord Mode Blue's left arm, and Jet Mode's right wing.
 Time Flyer 3: Piloted by Trip, armed with the Distortion Blast. Forms Time Force Megazord Mode Red's right leg, Time Force Megazord Mode Blue's right arm, and Jet Mode's left wing.
 Time Flyer 4: Piloted by Katie Walker, armed with the Heat Disrupter. Forms Time Force Megazord Mode Red's left arm, Time Force Megazord Mode Blue's right leg, and the left "rudder" of Jet Mode.
 Time Flyer 5: Piloted by Jen Scotts, armed with the Diffusion Shot. Forms Time Force Megazord Mode Red's right arm, Time Force Megazord Mode Blue's left leg, and the right "rudder" of Jet Mode.

Megazords
 Transwarp Megazord: Transwarp Megazord serves to send the Time Fliers and Shadow Winger through the time portal. Transwarp Megazord can perform a spinning fist attack.
 Time Force Megazord Jet Mode/Mode Red/Mode Blue: The five Time Fliers can combine into any configuration. Time Force Megazord has three forms; Jet Mode, Time Force Megazord Mode Red and Time Force Megazord Mode Blue. As Jet Mode, it can perform its Cyclone Defense attack to throw the Mutants off-balance. As Time Force Megazord Mode Blue, its armament is an over-sized handgun, in which form the Time Jet becomes a high-powered gun and uses Time Blast to perform its finishing move. As Time Force Megazord Mode Red, it can use its Time Force Megazord Saber to perform its finishing move, Time Strike. It is also equipped with the Shield as Time Force Megazord Mode Red.
 Shadow Winger/Time Shadow Megazord: It can transform from Winger Mode to Megazord mode which is armed with the double edged blade. Time Force Megazord Mode Red/Mode Blue can combine to form Shadow Force Megazord Mode Blue or Shadow Force Megazord Mode Red. Armed with the Shadow Force Megazord Saber that enables them to recapture mutants, it can become a gun for Shadow Force Megazord Mode Blue to use its Time Target finishing move or a sword for Shadow Force Megazord Mode Red to perform its Blizzard Slash finishing move. Time Shadow Megazord forms the chest, wings, posterior, feet, and foot guards for both forms, as well as the shoulder cannons for Shadow Force Megazord Mode Red.
 Quantasaurus Rex/Q-Rex: Eric Myers' personal zord. The Quantasaurus Rex's armaments are the Q-Rex Lasers. Quantasaurus Rex transforms into Megazord form, Quantasaurus Rex Megazord Mode, where its Q-Rex Missile are shot from its right hand and its Q-Rex Thunder Fist is fired from its left hand. Quantasaurus Rex Megazord Mode's finishing move, which allows it to recapture Mutants, is its Max Blizzard fired from the shoulders. Time Force Megazord Mode Red once rode on the Quantasaurus Rex's back in an impromptu riding formation.

Allies

Alex Drake
Alex is the former Red Time Force Ranger, and Jen's former fiancé. He is the descendant of Wesley Collins who is known for doing everything by the book and is obsessed with his job. He is supposedly killed by Ransik in the first episode yet barely survives.

After his recovery, Alex may have been promoted to high-ranking position as he is referred to as "sir" by his former commanding officer. On occasion, he secretly helped the Rangers from a small dark room in Time Force HQ. He sends the Time Shadow from this command system and keeps a close eye on the "past". He may have also been behind Eric's Mega Battle mode.

When he officially resurfaces, he intends to restore the future to the way it is after the events that occur have shifted the timeline. So he temporarily reclaims the Red Time Force Ranger powers from Wes while informing him that his father will die tomorrow. This is followed by Eric's contact to Wes that his father was badly injured during Ransik's raid on Bio-Lab. The other Rangers later ask him to give the Red Ranger powers back to Wes, who can inspire the team as Alex can't during the battle with Dragontron who he can't defeat. After Wes saves them from Frax and destroys the energy siphon Alex is trying to take out, he reluctantly hands his morpher over to Wes. Unlike Alex, Wes is easily able to defeat Dragontron using an unorthodox method. Afterwards, he realizes that Wes was right about the future, that it could be changed and doing the right thing, he saves Wes' father's life at the last minute when Alex has earlier revealed that he is fated to die.

When Jen is in trouble, Circuit contacts Alex and he sent Wes the Strata Cycle, telling him that Wes needs to protect Jen for him since he is not there, showing that despite the cold way he has treated Jen when he comes to the past, Alex still loves her.

When the Rangers are forced to return to the future by Wes after learning they would die in battle, Alex reveals to them that Wes will die in the battle to defeat Ransik and takes them to have their memories of the past erased. Ultimately the Rangers decide to go back and help Wes, though Alex is against it. He is hurt when he realizes Jen has come to love Wes, as she returns the engagement ring. Unable to stop her, Alex tells the Rangers to use the Time Force Megazord in Jet Mode to reach the past instead of the Time Ship as the Megazord has the best chance of making it through the vortex when things are so unstable in the past.

Alex is played by Jason Faunt.

Alice Roberts
Alice is a young girl who is one of Eric's neighbors and serves as a companion for him in his lonely hours. She makes her first appearance in "Quantum Secrets". She came over to Eric when she saw him outside feeding his two birds in a cage and asked Eric if she could talk to the birds. Startled by her appearance, Eric told her she could. Alice was pleased and while playing with his birds, she told Eric that everyone should have a friend, startling Eric even more. Alice and Eric's conversation was interrupted by the arrival of three men. The leader of the trio told Eric that he had to come with them, which he did reluctantly. Later on, Conwing was attacking Silver Hills. Alice raced over into Eric's backyard and rescued his birds. The following day, Alice returned to Eric's backyard as she had spotted him sitting dejectedly. Alice told him that she had the birds and proudly told him that she had rescued them. Eric was relieved to see his birds and told Alice that she was very brave, which she took in good stride. Eric told Alice that she could come and visit the birds any time she wanted, to which she was very happy about. He helped Alice up to get a closer looker at the birds. She chatted with Eric about friendship and with a heartfelt look on his face, Eric found his tough exterior softening in Alice's presence. Alice makes one more appearance in "Destiny Defeated". She ran up the sidewalk when she noticed Eric standing with his bird cage and luggage. She went up to the bird cage and started to play with the birds. Alice asked Eric if he was leaving, which he was. Eric told her that he was giving the birds to her and she cheered up right away. Alice gave Eric a hug, telling him that she was going to miss him very much. Eric was startled at first by the sweet sincerity of affection from Alice, but then he felt touched, smiled and returned the hug. A taxi pulled up and Eric tossed his luggage inside. Eric patted Alice on the head and then entered the taxi. The taxi drove off and Alice waved to Eric and he returned the wave until they were out of sight. She is never seen after this but it is known that she has Eric's birds.

Alice is played by Darcy O'Donnell.

Circuit
Circuit is a small robotic owl who serves as the Rangers' technical adviser, much in the vein of Alpha 5. He informs them of the weapons at their disposal, performs diagnostics on their equipment, and sends word to the future to send the Time Force Megazord whenever a mutant grows. When he is not performing Intel for the Rangers, he frequently resides in Trip's backpack. He also informs the Rangers of the first change to history, which is Mr. Collins' company creating a combat machine to fight back against Ransik. Circuit once tried to access information on the immediate future for the Rangers, but Alex saw this attempt and immediately made the information unavailable to prevent any changes to the timeline; this effort, of course, was rendered moot as the events Circuit saw came to pass. Circuit believed he had become faulty and useless to the Rangers, temporarily leaving them until a transmission from Alex convinced him that it was not his fault.

Circuit is voiced by Brianne Siddall.

Mr. Collins
Mr. Collins is a tycoon who is Wes' father, the CEO of Bio-Lab, and founder of the Silver Guardians. Wes left his father to make a name for himself, but Mr. Collins saw him as a failure. He then focused his efforts on advancing Bio Lab technology by examining the Quantum powers, and creating Trizyrium Crystals. In effort to protect Silver Hills from Ransik's forces, Mr. Collins created the Silver Guardians. When Mr. Collins discovered that his son was the Red Ranger, things changed. He became proud of his son for breaking away from him and making his own future.

Mr. Collins even stood up to Ransik, who attacked Bio Lab for the antidote to Venomark's bite. He tells Ransik that he'd have flushed the serum down the drain if he knew that it was keeping the mutant alive. When Ransik taunts him about his own rejection in Wes not following his footsteps, Mr. Collins tells him that he is proud of Wes regardless and loves him. Mr. Collins is then gravely injured by an energy blast from Ransik and taken to the hospital. When Alex shows up from the future, he reveals that Mr. Collins will die the next day and that Wes' destiny is to take over Bio-Lab from him as Eric contacts Wes to let him know what happened. Wes takes control of Bio Lab at the insistence of Dr. Zaskin, but is not happy there and returns to the Rangers after learning from Dr. Zaskin that his father was proud of him for being a Ranger. While Wes leads the Rangers in destroying Dragontron, Mr. Collins nearly dies as predicted, but is saved at the last minute by Alex with future technology as Wes made Alex see the future is not set in stone. Wes and Mr. Collins made up afterwards with Mr. Collins encouraging Wes to return to the Rangers and admitting that he was proud of him. He was also proud of Wes for taking his place as head of his company while he was absent, but accepts it is not Wes' role (even telling him as much). Due to the interference in the present caused by Ransik and Time Force, Bio-Lab created the Trizyrium crystals 100 years too early; the possibility of clean, infinite energy is enticing. However, Mr. Collins decides against continuing Tryzyrium crystal research after Wes explains the other Rangers' origins and the damage to the timeline the crystals could do. During the final battle with Ransik, Mr. Collins risks his life to search the city for his son, having his butler Philips transport an injured child and his mother to the hospital. He is eventually reunited with Wes and Eric and witnesses Eric being wounded. When Wes heads off to fight on his own, Mr. Collins takes Eric to the hospital. After the Rangers return to the future, Mr. Collins offers Wes command of the Silver Guardians, which he changes to protecting the city for free rather than profit. Wes agrees on the condition that Eric is his partner, which Mr. Collins is very happy with.

Mr. Collins is played by late Edward Laurence Albert.

Captain Logan
Captain Logan is the head of Time Force and the Rangers' superior officer. After Ransik's escape, he angrily relieved them of their duties and refused to listen to their explanations. Despite that, he provides help to the Rangers when they are sent back in time, supplying Zords and weapons.

After Izout badly damaged the Time Force Megazord, Captain Logan ordered his men to work on repairing it. When Tronicon attacks Silver Hills, Circuit contacts Captain Logan about the status of the Time Force Megazord as he is told that it is still being repaired.

For unknown reasons when Alex was revealed as the man in the shadows, Captain Logan refers to him as "sir" (even though Alex is clearly a subordinate in the beginning) when he informs him that Steelix has been contained. It's possible Alex's near-death experience in trying to stop Ransik got him promoted. After Alex revealed himself to the Rangers, he took Captain Logan's place as the Rangers' contact in the future.

Logan is played by Roy Werner.

Philips
Philips is the Collins Family's butler and chauffeur. He gives Wes some advice once in a while.

Philips is played by Douglas Fisher.

Dr. Michael Zaskin
Dr. Michael Zaskin is a scientist who works for Collins at Bio-Lab and is the father of Holly Zaskin. He was once captured by Klawlox and Nadira in an attempt to learn all about the secrets of the Quantum Ranger powers.

When Ransik assaulted Bio-Lab to obtain the serum for treating Venomark's poison, he witnesses Mr. Collins confronting him about Wes' destiny. Dr. Zaskin tells Wes about what he witnessed and only then Wes realized how much his father loves him.

Dr. Zaskin later informed Mr. Collins about the Trizyrium Crystals that power Doomtron and the Q-Rex are causing time portals to appear in the skies of Silver Hills.

Dr. Zaskin is played by Ken Merckx.

Silver Guardians
The Silver Guardians are a private security force funded by Wes' father and later led by Eric (after becoming the Quantum Ranger) that protected Silver Hills from Ransik's mutants, but for profit. Because of such, only the wealthy could afford to be protected by the Silver Guardians. They hold a tenuous relationship with the Time Force Rangers, often running into each other when a mutant attacks. At the end of the series, Wes becomes co-leader of the Silver Guardians with Eric. At this time the Guardians are changed so they protect the city for free.

In Power Rangers Wild Force, the Silver Guardians appear to be more of a police force than a private security force, showing that the change promised by Mr. Collins was indeed genuine.

White Knight
The White Knight was the enemy of the Black Knight. The White Knight protected the Battle Fire, but was defeated by the Black Knight. His spirit appeared to Wes when Wes received the Battle Fire.

White Knight is voiced by Oliver Page while his suit actor is played by Justin Neal Thompson.

Mutants
The Mutants are criminals that had traveled back in time with the criminal Ransik. He and the other mutants are shown to be byproducts of the future's genetic experiments, and were shunned by much of society. In the finale, certain characters were redeemed by the Time Force Power Rangers and willingly gave themselves up for judgement, returning in the following series to aid the Rangers in the crossover with Power Rangers Wild Force.

Ransik
Ransik is a mutant mastermind created by accident in 3000 and the main antagonist in the series. He possessed abilities such as energy projection, martial arts, and telekinesis. After being bitten by the mutant Venomark, he became dependent on a serum developed by Dr. Louis Ferricks; however, due to his unique DNA, Ransik would need to keep drinking the serum until the symptoms stopped recurring. He rewarded the scientist by destroying his lab and leaving him for dead. In the later episodes, Ransik no longer needs the serum. He also encountered the last surviving Orgs, who had been turned to stone. In exchange for letting them copy his mutant DNA to escape, Ransik gained greater power (such as the ability to pull weapons – swords, mostly – from his skin). While still needing the serum, his body produced weapons at random the longer he went without drinking it. Ransik's plans involve commandeering the Time Force Cryo-Prison and traveling back in time to take over with an army of mutants that committed crimes in Millennium City. He is thwarted in his first attempt by Alex, the original Red Time Force Ranger, who narrowly manages to arrest him. However, en route to the prison, Ransik is rescued by his daughter Nadira and his robotic minion Frax. They escape and accomplish Ransik's goals, and Ransik also puts Alex out of action for a long time. Alex was, in fact, thought-to-be-dead – motivating Jen, the Pink Time Force Ranger, to seek justice and revenge. In 2001, Ransik soon finds himself menaced by Alex's teammates and new Red Time Force Ranger Wes Collins (whom he initially mistook for Alex, due to Wes being his ancestor) upon landing in the city of Silver Hills. He uses various schemes and mutants to attack the Rangers, but never succeeds; unlike his predecessors, Ransik's schemes are cold and logical. During an early encounter with Wes, Ransik claims that he was a misunderstood outcast in the future utopia and that all mutants were oppressed. Jenn disputes this – saying that Ransik rejected any offers of help from normal humans. Wes remains unsure regardless.

Ransik temporarily takes control of the Quantasaurus Rex, but it's reclaimed by the Quantum Ranger. Shortly afterwards, Frax betrays Ransik and destroys all his serum. He reveals, before escaping that he was the robotic-modified version of Dr. Ferricks (who swore revenge on Ransik for the destruction of his lab and his current appearance). Unfortunately for Frax's plan, Bio-Lab had begun producing the serum they replicated from a sample Wes had found before Venomark's defeat. Ransik breaks in, steals a vial of the serum and drinks it, which permanently cures him of his ailment. While drinking it, he is noticed by Wes' father, Mr. Collins, who then admits that if he had known the true nature of the serum, he would've flushed it down the drain. Ransik fires an energy blast that puts him in a coma and escapes. Ransik eventually runs out of mutants, but captures and reprograms Frax into being his mindless slave. He unleashes a mass assault on the city with Doomtron, and destroys the Rangers' clock tower base. However, the Doomtron is destroyed by Wes. The Rangers then attempt to arrest Ransik, but he overpowers them almost effortlessly. Wes is the only one that lands a real hit on him using his Red Battle Warrior Armor. While facing Jen, he accidentally injures Nadira, who had changed her attitude towards humans. After talking with her briefly, and realizing how close he had come to losing her, Ransik willingly turned himself in. He is the second villain of the Power Rangers series to not be destroyed in the end.

During Power Rangers Wild Force's two-part crossover "Reinforcements from the Future", Ransik comes back to the present with the Time Force Power Rangers and Nadira to help stop the Mut-Orgs, the three Orgs he found in the future. He was possibly given a life-sentence, minus the cryogenic freeze, due to willingly surrendering to the Rangers, as he is in a cell under heavy guard when he is released to help stop the Mut-Orgs. Jen showed hostility when she saw Ransik again, but Cole Evans sensed that he was telling the truth and convinced her to give him a chance. Ransik, having already seen the error of his ways, shows a clear amount of guilt for the Mut-Orgs' existence. He aids the combined Time Force/Wild Force teams, and during the battle he launched a near-suicidal attack on the Mut-Orgs and destroys their mutant halves, but nearly dies in the process. He is later shown to be alive and his mutant side is purged, making him human. Thus, Ransik is one of the few Power Ranger villains to truly find redemption.

Ransik is played by Vernon Wells.

Nadira
Nadira is the daughter of the criminal Ransik, who traveled back in time with her father to 2001. She is a rather obnoxious humanoid, who loves being told she is beautiful. She is similar to Trakeena from Power Rangers Lost Galaxy but is much less malevolent. Nadira would much rather run than fight, but when necessary she was a formidable opponent who possessed the ability to extend her fingernails to use as weapons. She also displayed superhuman strength, the ability to alter clothing, and to teleport. Nadira adores the 21st century fashion, frequently stealing clothing and jewelry. Nadira engineered Ransik's escape from custody, lying down on the ground and pretending to be injured. She aided her father's raid on the Cryo Prison and prevented the mutant criminal Gluto from being cryogenically frozen. Along with Ransik, Frax and Gluto, she traveled back in time to 2001. Nadira believed that the key to controlling the world in this time period was to be wealthy, and she frequently tries to accumulate more through extortion or theft. One of her schemes lead to Wes leaving his father, due to the lack of concern for a bus full of children held hostage; her plan was to hold someone of importance hostage for ransom, but the mutant she charged with the task bumbled. However, she is always defeated by the Time Force Rangers. A running gag was that Gluto had a crush on her and would try in vain to woo her, but would always be rejected. In the last episodes, as Gluto and the Cyclobots hunt down Frax, Nadira diverts herself by taking over a clothing store. Trip shows up alone to stop her, and takes on the mutant. But when a pregnant woman goes into labor, the two stop and try to help her. Trip forces Nadira to help the woman deliver her baby. Nadira emerges from the dressing room with the newborn, who she calls beautiful. Trip tells her that humans cannot be all bad, and Nadira agrees. After playing with human children, Nadira questions her supposed hatred for them. Nadira goes to an imprisoned Frax for answers. He tells her that hate is a vicious cycle propagated by humans and mutants. As Frax is taken away in chains, she apologizes for the way Ransik has treated him. In the moment, he sees a spark of goodness in Nadira and urges her to break the cycle. As Nadira tries to make Ransik stop the hate, he scolds her for mourning over Frax, and knocks her down. When a baby was left behind during the attack, she decided to keep it safe and try to find its parents. While doing that, she is accidentally wounded by Ransik and asked him to do the right thing, revealing that mutants can forgive humans. Thanks to her, her father realizes his mistakes, and willingly surrenders to the Rangers.

Within a year of her return to the future, Nadira is working with children. Apparently Lucas managed to set her up so that she either did not have to go to prison, got community service, did not have a long prison sentence, or was pardoned for her crimes. She accompanied Ransik and the other Time Force Rangers in the Power Rangers Wild Force team-up episode to help them fight the Mut-Orgs. Apparently she likes Lucas as in one episode she goes out on a date with him after thinking he wrote poetry about her (it was about his race car) but in Reinforcements From the Future at the end he walks off with her holding hands indicating that he may possibly return her feelings.

Nadira is played by Kate Sheldon.

Frax
Frax is a robot in the service of Ransik, responsible for constructing the army of robot minions that Ransik sends against the Time Force Rangers. A robot himself, he dislikes Ransik's belief that robots are inferior, as well as the mutant's habits of destroying his creations when he is angry. This rage goes unnoticed by Ransik for much of the series until Frax's Fury, when Frax finally takes his anger out on him. Frax's arsenal consists of a claw arm that transforms into a hand-like missile launcher. It is later revealed that Frax is actually all that is left of Dr. Louis Ferricks (portrayed by Jeff Griggs), the scientist from the future who attempted to heal Ransik of his poisoning by Venomark, a mutant criminal who is later captured and placed in the X-Vault. He also provides the serum that Ransik must consume regularly to combat the poison, expecting nothing in return. Dr. Ferricks was a truly compassionate human, not caring about who or what he helped. Ransik destroys his lab, steals the serum supplies, and leaves him for dead. Dr. Fericks only survives by rebuilding himself into a robot, and resents Ransik for his actions.

Later in the series, Frax ends up discovering the key to the X-Vault (where the worst prisoners are contained) after being admonished for sending his robotic creation Tronicon to destroy the Rangers. He releases many of them without Ransik's approval, including Venomark (an action that angers Ransik due to their past history). As a form of revenge, he destroys all of his serum, reveals his true identity to Ransik, and runs away from Ransik and the Cyclobots on Ransik's side. However, Wes found the sample of the serum that Ransik left behind and Bio-Lab began producing the serum to treat the citizens infected by Venomark causing Ransik to do a raid on Bio-Lab. Despite this, he moved to an abandoned factory, where he began constructing massive robots that run on powerful Trizyrium crystals from Mr. Collins' lab.

In the series finale, Frax is captured by Ransik with the aid of Gluto (who finds Frax's hideout) while working on his giant robot Doomtron, prompting Nadira to come to him after she begins to doubt her father's mission. Frax explains that the hatred and prejudice between humans and mutants is a vicious cycle and he urges her to break it before being taken away and having his memory erased. He is then reprogrammed to obey Ransik without a question (which makes him much more evil than before) and use Doomtron to wreak havoc in the city. Wes is able to return and destroy Doomtron, taking Frax down with it as a result.

Frax is voiced by Eddie Frierson.

Gluto
Gluto is a minor, mafioso-themed, mutant criminal who joins the service of Ransik when he is saved from stasis by the arrival of the villain's forces. He appears to be a blue whale-like mutant. He aids Ransik in the 21st century, serving as the dumb muscle of the mutant army.

A running gag is his crush on Ransik's daughter, Nadira, and his attempts to win her affection; he would always be promptly rejected.

Gluto later finds the hideout of Frax and brings in Ransik to collect him. During the final assault on the city, Gluto decides to freeze himself inside the prison where he was unwilling to stick around for whatever might happen.

Gluto is voiced by Neil Kaplan.

Quarganon
Quarganon is a Super Demon who was imprisoned within an artifact known as the Solar Amulet. When Vypra comes back to life, she attempts to steal the Amulet. Because she is a ghost, she cannot take it from inside its case. She forms an alliance with Ransik and succeeds in stealing it. For Vypra to free Quarganon, the sun must be in alignment with the stars and speak the required incantation. Despite attempts by Carter and the Time Force Rangers to stop the ritual and destroy the Solar Amulet, Vypra successfully summons the powerful Super Demon through this incantation:

The Solar Amulet then glows and Quarganon emerges from it. However, the Lightspeed Rangers arrive to help the Time Force Rangers. Carter Grayson (Red Lightspeed Ranger) destroys him with his Trans-Armor Cycle and Vypra by Wesley Collins (Red Time Force Ranger) with his Red Battle Warrior.

Quarganon is voiced by Ron Roggé who was uncredited for the role.

Cyclobots
The Cyclobots are Ransik's robotic foot soldiers that were originally invented by Dr. Ferricks. He intended them as friends and aides, but Ransik stole the schematics when he betrayed the doctor and destroyed his Cyclobot aids. They are fairly strong and attack in massive hordes, but the Rangers have little trouble defeating them. They can be deployed from small golden bolts or disguise themselves as humans to ambush their foes. They are unable to speak when in their true form. They usually wield short swords that double as energy blasters and it has parts that are similar to Darth Maul's Lightsaber, but have occasionally carried more powerful bazookas for widespread destruction.

Mutant criminals
These are mutant criminals that have been captured by Time Force and cryogenically frozen in the Cryo-Prison as shrunken figures after committing crimes in Millennium City. When Ransik hijacked it, he had an army of mutants at his disposal. Every Mutant has a Mutant Seal Patch on their bodies that causes them to grow to a massive size if removed. They revert to their shrunken state when defeated in normal or giant forms, after which one of the Rangers places them in a studded container with a window on the front that displays the imprisoned mutant. The containers are stored in a fridge-like unit in the Rangers' base, ready for transport back to the future.

 Flamecon (voiced by Michael Sorich) – A punk-themed mutant who first appeared in the first episode where he was frozen. Later, he attacked Silver Hills in the sixth episode. He was frozen by The Time Force Megazord Mode Red.
 Jetara (voiced by Derek Stephen Prince) – A ladybug-themed mutant who is first criminal to be released from the Cyro-prison. He starts wreaking havoc on the relatively primitive police force of Silver Hills. It was during this battle that Wesley discovered what the Mutant Seal Patch does when he accidentally destroys it causing Jetara to grow. He was frozen by the Time Force Megazord Mode Red.
 Fearog (voiced by David Stenstrom) – A gecko-themed mutant sent by Ransik to attack Wes. He was frozen by the Time Force Megazord Mode Red.
 "Samurhive" – A samurai/bee stinger-themed mutant who appears in one of Ransik's flashbacks.
 "Eyacon" – A three-eyed mutant who appears in one of Ransik's flashbacks.
 Mantamobile (voiced by Richard Steven Horvitz) – A light blue water flea-themed mutant. He is a master car thief, specializing in hijacking and upgrading vehicles with his tentacles. He was frozen by the Time Force Megazord Mode Red.
 Tentaclaw (voiced by Ezra Weisz) – A mutant whose head and body can act independent of each other. His octopus-like head can levitate and produce numerous tentacles for combat, while his lobster-like body has great strength. He was known for kidnapping the Mayor of Millennium City in the year 3000. It's his history that caused Nadira to revive him in another bid to get rich in the present by kidnapping the kids from the park and holding them for ransom. He was frozen by the Vortex Blaster while his body is frozen by the Time Force Megazord Mode Blue.
 "Rabbitcon" (voiced by Eddie Frierson) – A mutant released by Ransik in the seventh episode to attack the city. He attacked Silver Hills with army of Cyclobots and encountered the Rangers. Trip offered it to surrender without battle, but the mutant refused and the battle started. He nearly defeated Trip with his tentacles, but he defeated it with Time Strike of his sword. He was nearly defeated, but he removed his DNA patch and enlarged himself. In the giant battle, he tried to battle the Ranger's Zords with his powerful laser eye, but was defeated by Time Flyers. He was defeated and frozen by Time Force Megazord.
 Medicon (voiced by Dan Woren) – A white-colored robotic surgeon mutant whom Frax dismissed as "nothing but a quack". When Nadira kidnapped Circuit, Medicon severely damaged Circuit, preventing him from calling on the Time Fliers. He then fought the Rangers and took advantage of the Time Force Megazord's absence to attack Silver Hills as a giant. However Trip rescued and repaired Circuit, allowing him to call the Time Force Megazord and defeat the mutant.
 Fatcatfish (voiced by Tom Wyner) – A quite cowardly catfish-themed bounty hunter that once fought Alex and Jen. Ransik unfroze him so he could place a bounty on the Rangers. However, he ended up spending the first half of his payment on buying gifts for Nadira, who tried to seduce him for his money. When it fought the Rangers, he taunted Jen over Alex's death, driving her to nearly destroy him rather than arrest him like the other mutants and it was only by Wes talking her down and asking her what Alex would do that prevented her from finishing him off. He also was disrespectful towards robots, using the Cyclobots as target practice, this led Frax to get revenge by setting up both Fatcatfish and Ransik to be busted by Time Force. He was frozen by the Time Force Megazord Mode Red.
 Izout (voiced by David Lodge) – A cyborg hammerhead shark monster. Heavily armed with guns and grenades, he helps Frax into breaking into Bio-Lab to steal the Zirium Powder. After crippling the Time Force Megazord, he was frozen by the Time Jet.
 Redeye (voiced by Wendee Lee) – A red-eyed female swallow-themed mutant who attacked Silver Hills. A clone of her appeared in Miracon's mirror world but was destroyed by the Rangers.
 Electropede (voiced by Steve Kramer) – An energy-draining caterpillar-themed mutant that Ransik used to drain the city's power and could absorb the energy from the Rangers' weapons and was going to release all the energy he absorbed to destroy the city. However Trip's invention, the Electro-Booster, overloaded his energy, causing him to expel it harmlessly and reducing him to a husk. Frax made it grow by shooting off his DNA patch, but the mutant was frozen by the Shadow Force Megazord Mode Blue.
 Brickneck (voiced by Michael Sorich) – A brick-necked cocoon-themed soldier mutant sent by Ransik to raid a dig site to steal the Quantum Controller. He was frozen by the Quantum Ranger.
 Commandocon (voiced by Dave Mallow) – A metallic commando-themed mutant with a hunting-motif who can generate time portals. He was sent to the distant past in order to retrieve the Quantasaurus Rex. He was frozen by the Q-Rex Megazord Mode.
 Klawlox (voiced by Tony Oliver) – A yellow hammerhead shark-themed mutant with a lobster claw for a right hand who captured Dr. Michael Zaskin in an attempt to learn all the secrets of the Quantum Ranger powers. He was frozen by the Q-Rex and Shadow Force Megazord Mode Red.
 "Cruel Senturicon" – A traffic police-themed mutant In the seventeenth episode, he was released by Ransik. He attacked Silver Hills with an army of Cyclobots and fought the Rangers. He used his anchor arms in battle. The Rangers quickly defeated all the Cyclobots and then fought the mutant, who the removed his DNA patch and enlarged himself. The Rangers formed the Time Force Megazord Mode Blue and started the battle. In his giant form, he was more powerful and used his ability to become invisible and attacked the Megazord from different sides, using his super speed and his mace. Despite all of this, the Rangers used Mode Red and defeated him.
 Turtlecon (voiced by Steve McGowan) – A turtle-themed mutant with a remote that can send people into pocket dimensions. He was frozen by the Shadow Force Megazord Mode Blue.
 Notacon (voiced by Barbara Goodson) – A powerful but good-hearted jellyfish/squid-themed mutant with tentacle arms. His bizarre appearance caused people to fear and shun him which forced him to steal to survive, with his petty theft of vegetables getting him busted by Time Force. He was frozen by the Shadow Force Megazord Mode Red. He is the only mutant who willingly allows himself to be captured.
 Conwing (voiced by Sean Cw Johnson) – A squid-themed mutant who is able to disguise himself as a human (portrayed by Don Dowe). He used a device to match Eric's voice and take control of the Quantasaurus Rex. He was frozen by the Quantum Ranger's Megabattle Mode.
 Dash (voiced by Riley Schmidt) – A race car driver mutant with incredible-albeit reckless driving skills. Like several other mutants, he can adopt a human form (also played by Riley Schmidt), although his bizarre taste in food (banana with ketchup) can give him away. He and Lucas were friendly racing rivals until it injured innocent bystanders with his driving. Lucas testified against him, leading to its incarceration in the Cryo-Prison. He was frozen by the Time Force Megazord Mode Red.
 Contemptra (voiced by Valerie Vernon) – A female Gorgon-themed mutant with the ability to brainwash others using her snake bracelet. She appeared in the form of an attractive female human named Angelique (portrayed by Rachelle Pettinato) to seed discord into Wes, Trip, and Lucas (although Wes was initially able to resist her influence due to his attraction to Jen). Jen and Katie were able to break the others free from her control by destroying her snake bracelet. She was frozen by the Shadow Force Megazord Mode Red.
 Ironspike (voiced by Richard Cansino) – A really strong Oni-themed mutant with spikes on his head and shoulder pads that wielded a sword. He was also one of the mutants that the Rangers encountered again in Miracon's mirror world.
 Artillicon (voiced by Bob Papenbrook) – A mechanical-looking mutant with powerful weapons. He can turn into a jet for quick escapes. He was frozen by the Time Force Megazord Mode Red.
 Cinecon (voiced by Terrence Stone) – A film director-themed mutant. He posed as a film director (portrayed by Harvey Shain) to lure the Rangers into a trap that involved a Power Rangers movie that turned out to be titled "The End of the Power Rangers". His clapperboard can transfer people into movie-like settings and he can warp reality by writing events into a binder. He was frozen by the Shadow Force Megazord Mode Blue after his originally scripted victory was interrupted by Trip taking out the last page earlier to get an autograph.
 Steelix (voiced by J.W. Myers) – Jen's original partner in Time Force, who was secretly a mole selling top-secret information to Ransik. When Jen found out, she brought him in. He was sentenced to cryo-freeze. When Ransik releases him after returning to the past, the mutant decides to exact revenge on Jen. He was frozen by the Shadow Force Megazord Mode Blue.
 Severax (voiced by Paul Schrier) – A mechanical ax-themed mutant. After Frax destroys Ransik's serum supply and flees, Ransik releases him to take part in a raid on Bio-Lab to steal the serums there. He was frozen by the Shadow Force Megazord Mode Red.
 "Chef Bug" – A bug/pig-themed mutant who resembles a cook. He was mentioned by Ransik in his discussion to Nadira.
 Mister Mechanau (voiced by Mike Reynolds) – A dark wizard-themed mutant with a sword and telekinetic powers. After Frax restored him, he posed as a human salesman (portrayed by C.J. Byrnes) to get customers to buy a fitness drink that made them act like Cyclobots, giving Frax a new army. He was frozen by the Shadow Force Megazord Mode Blue.
 Miracon (voiced by Philip Proctor) – A big-brained mutant that can travel through mirrors. He captured the Rangers through mirrors and pulled them into another dimension within the mirrors where he pitted them against mutants they had already arrested. It also briefly turned the Shadow Force Megazord against the other Rangers before he was finally defeated.
 Angelcon (voiced by Kirk Thornton) – A white angel-themed mutant who appeared in one of the mirrors of the Mirror World that was destroyed by the Yellow Ranger.
 Chameliacon (voiced by Kerrigan Mahan) – A chameleon-themed mutant with powerful tongue attacks. He was frozen by the Shadow Force Megazord Mode Blue.
 Serpicon (voiced by Mark A. Richardson) – A giant girdled lizard-themed mutant. He attacked a local space center in Silver Hills in order to set it to self-destruct. He was frozen by the Q-Rex Megazord Mode.

X-Vault Mutants
Several of the most dangerous mutants are placed in a separate location called the X-Vault. They serve Frax, as he is the only one with the key to the vault. Ransik and the others were unaware of the vault until the finale which Nadira noted that the X-Vault is empty which is odd, unless they broke the door to access the mutants (of which there were six more).

 Vexicon (voiced by Richard Epcar) – A toy-themed mutant. When Frax accidentally stumbled upon the key to the X-Vault, he was the first mutant he released from the infamous storage area. He was extremely hard to take down, managing to defeat the Rangers with ease in their first meeting. He was frozen by the Shadow Force Megazord Mode Blue.
 Univolt (voiced by Bob Papenbrook) – An electrical mutant that was imprisoned in the Cryo-Prison's X-Vault until he was released by Frax. He was also responsible for exposing Wes' identity in front of his father and Eric. He was frozen by the Vortex Blaster.
 Venomark (voiced by Kim Strauss) – A twisted Scream-inspired mutant that was imprisoned in the Cryo-Prison's X-Vault until he was released by Frax. He has super speed and the ability to conjure a sword from thin air, but his main weapon is his bite, which inflicts an extremely painful and lethal disease on anyone he can sink his fangs into. One of his victims was Ransik, causing the latter to develop a massive grudge against him. The only known cure for his bite is a serum invented by Dr. Louis Ferricks. He was frozen by the Shadow Force Megazord Mode Red and the Q-Rex Megazord Mode.

Frax's Robots
These robots are creations of Frax, mostly after his betrayal of Ransik. They are functionally similar to the regular mutant enemies, but are completely silent and are actually destroyed in battle, rather than being imprisoned. They are usually powered by Trizirium Crystals. Two of them have a Mutant Seal Patch on them implying that Frax also used synthetic DNA to create them.

 Tronicon (voiced by Kim Strauss) – Frax's first robot was designed to prove that robots are just as effective as mutants against the Power Rangers. Physically, it resembled a heavily armed Cyclobot with extra armor on its torso. It attacked with lasers from its cannon arm, rockets from a launcher above said cannon, and rebounding energy discs from its shoulders. This robotic monster was destroyed by the Time Shadow Megazord in its first battle. Ransik later saw the footage and was displeased with Frax using a robot to destroy the Rangers.
 Dragontron – A giant dragon-like robot that was created by Frax following his breaking away from Ransik. It was extremely strong and durable, with impressive regeneration abilities to boot. Its only weakness was an exposed core on its back, but Frax could usually cover this weakness when directly overseeing his creation. When Wes rejoins the Rangers, they use the Time Force Megazord to destroy it while they are riding on the Q-Rex.
 Max Axe – A robot created by Frax to wreak havoc on the city while he was completing his ultimate weapon. It was heavily armed, with large cannons on its shoulders, a Gatling gun for a left hand, and an ax blade on its right hand. Eric uses the Quantum Defender while on the Q-Rex to destroy it.
 Doomtron – The final robot created by Frax is this massive crab-clawed machine which seemingly bears its maker's image on its face. Unlike the previous robots, it required a pilot to function as Frax himself only pilots it after Ransik captures and reprograms him into a mindlessly loyal slave. When Wes regains control of the Q-Rex, he uses the Quantum Defender to destroy Doomtron, also destroying Frax in the process.

Black Knight
An evil Black Knight who appeared in "Beware the Knight". It is the only non-mutant, robot or demon the Time Force Rangers face, possibly being a ghost. He went after a legendary power source known as the Battle Fire, but was stopped by the knight it belonged to; he sought any brave warriors with pure hearts through the ages to open the box housing the power. A dragon guards the box for him. The Knight appeared to have gotten desperate by the 21st century, since he targeted anyone claiming that they would protect others. Wes got to the Battle Fire first, and received the Red Battle Warrior Armor, which he used to destroy the Black Knight.

The Black Knight is voiced by Dave Mallow and his suit actor is played by Kelly Bailey.

Notes

References

External links
 Official Power Rangers Website
 

Television characters introduced in 2001
Time Force
Characters